Romeo Must Die: The Album is the soundtrack to Andrzej Bartkowiak's 2000 action film Romeo Must Die, composed of hip hop and R&B music. It was released on March 28, 2000 through Blackground Records and Virgin Records in association with Warner Bros. Records (who helped co-financed the soundtrack). Recording sessions took time between May 1999 and January 2000.

Production was handled by several record producers, including Irv Gotti, Rapture Stewart, Ant Banks, Eric Seats, Mannie Fresh, J Dub, and Timbaland, who also served as executive producer along with Barry and Jomo Hankerson, and the film star Aaliyah.

It features contributions from Aaliyah, who appears on fours songs, as well as B.G., Chanté Moore, Dave Hollister, Destiny's Child, Ginuwine, Joe, Lil' Mo, Mack 10, Playa, Stanley Clarke, The Comrads and more.

Three singles and music videos were released from the album: Aaliyah's number one pop hit "Try Again" (directed by Wayne Isham), Aaliyah and her co-star DMX duet "Come Back in One Piece" (directed by Little X), and Timbaland & Magoo's "We At It Again" (directed by Chris Robinson), which introduced Timbaland's younger brother, rapper Sebastian, to audiences. Q magazine included the soundtrack album in their list of the '5 Best Compilations of 2000'.

In August 2021, it was reported that Aaliyah's recorded work for Blackground (since rebranded as Blackground Records 2.0) would be re-released on physical, digital, and, for the first time ever, streaming services in a deal between the label and Empire Distribution Romeo Must Die: The Album was re-released on September 3, 2021.

Commercial performance 
In the United States, the soundtrack debuted at number 3 on the Billboard 200 and topped the Top R&B/Hip-Hop Albums chart selling 203,000 in its first week. It was certified Platinum by the Recording Industry Association of America on May 2, 2000 for selling a million copies. The album sold 1.3 million copies by the end of 2000. By 2001 the album sold 1.5 million copies domestically and over 2 million copies internationally.

In Canada, the soundtrack peaked at number 4 and was certified Platinum by Music Canada. The album reached number 6 in Germany and lasted at number 76 in the year-ending. In 2013, it also was certified Silver by the British Phonographic Industry.

Track listing

Notes
Tracks 8, 13, 14, 16, 17 and 18 did not appear in the film

Other songs
These songs did appear in the film but were not released on the soundtrack:
"First I'm Gonna Crawl" performed by DMX
"You're Not From Brighton" performed by Fatboy Slim
"I See You Baby (Full Frontal Mix)" performed by Groove Armada and Gramma Funk
"Inside My Mind/Blue Skies" performed by Groove Armada
"High Roller" and "Keep Hope Alive" performed by The Crystal Method
"Going Home" performed by DJ Frane

Charts

Weekly charts

Year-end charts

Decade-end charts

Certifications

See also
List of Billboard number-one R&B albums of 2000

References

External links
 
 

Hip hop soundtracks
2000 soundtrack albums
Action film soundtracks
Albums produced by Ant Banks
Albums produced by Irv Gotti
Albums produced by Timbaland
Contemporary R&B soundtracks
Albums produced by Mannie Fresh
Albums produced by Stanley Clarke